The 2015–16 season was Queens Park Rangers' first season back in the Football League Championship following their relegation from the Premier League last season and their 134th year in existence. Along with the Championship, the club also competed in the FA Cup and the Football League Cup. The season covers the period from 1 July 2015 to 30 June 2016.

Kit
Supplier: Nike / Sponsor: AirAsia

Kit information
The club is in the second year of a deal with the American manufacturer Nike, who will supply their kit for four years.

Club

Coaching staff

Updated 7 August 2015.

Board of Directors

Updated 15 June 2015.

Players

First team squad

Trialists

Players

New contracts

Signed contracts

Players

Managerial and boardroom

Transfers

Transfers in

Players

Managerial and boardroom

Loans in

Transfers out

Players

Managerial and boardroom

Loans out

Players

Overall transfer activity

Spending
Summer:  £6,750,000

Winter:  £3,520,000

Total:  £10,270,000

Income
Summer:  £3,500,000

Winter:  £4,000,000

Total:  £7,500,000

Expenditure
Summer:  £3,250,000

Winter:  £480,000

Total:  £2,770,000

Managerial and boardroom position changes

Friendlies

Pre-season friendlies
On 29 May 2015, Queens Park Rangers announced their pre-season fixtures.

Friendlies during season

Competitions

Championship

League table

Results summary
{Overall	Home	Away
P     W    D	L       GF	GA	 Pts	W	D	L	GF	GA     W	D	L	GF      GA  
46    14   18	14	54	54	 60	10	9	4	37	25     4        9	10	17	29

Results by matchday

Matches
On 17 June 2015, the fixtures for the forthcoming season were announced.

FA Cup

League Cup

Squad statistics

Statistics

|}
† denotes players that left the club during the season.

Goals

Own Goals

Clean sheets

Discipline

Bookings

Penalties

Awards

External awards

Managerial and boardroom

Club awards

Players

References

Notes

Queens Park Rangers F.C. seasons
Queens Park Rangers